Vent Geyser is a geyser in the Upper Geyser Basin of Yellowstone National Park in the United States.

Vent Geyser belongs to the Grand Group (or Grand Geyser Complex), and its eruption is tied to Grand Geyser.  Normally, it erupts immediately after Grand and continues to erupt intermittently for about an hour afterward along with Turban Geyser.  On rare occasions, it has erupted before Grand or completely by itself. Its fountain reaches a height of  initially then subsides to 20 to 40 feet (6–12 m).  At times, it is not possible to see Vent erupting through the steam and spray of Grand Geyser.

References

Geysers of Wyoming
Geothermal features of Teton County, Wyoming
Geothermal features of Yellowstone National Park
Geysers of Teton County, Wyoming